Blue Period is the third studio album by jazz musician Miles Davis. It was released in 1953 as a 10" LP, his second released by Prestige Records, recorded over the course of two 1951 recording sessions at New York's Apex Studio.

Background
"Bluing" and "Out of the Blue", two Davis compositions, were recorded on October 5, 1951,  at the same session as the material for his first album The New Sounds (PRLP 124). "Blue Room", composed by Rodgers and Hart, was recorded earlier that year, at the same January 17 recording session as the three tracks used on the various artists LP Modern Jazz Trumpets (PRLP 113). This earlier session was Davis' first for Prestige.

The tracks on Blue Period were split when Prestige reconfigured its recordings for 12-inch LP. "Bluing" and "Out of the Blue" are featured on  Dig (PRLP 7012), and two versions of "Blue Room" (including an alternate take) are on the CD of Miles Davis and Horns (originally PRLP 7025).

Track listing

Personnel
 Miles Davis – trumpet
 Jackie McLean – alto saxophone
 Sonny Rollins – tenor saxophone
 Walter Bishop, Jr. – piano
 Tommy Potter – double bass
 Art Blakey – drums

On "Blue Room"
 Miles Davis – trumpet
 Sonny Rollins – tenor saxophone
 John Lewis – piano
 Percy Heath – double bass
 Roy Haynes – drums

References

1953 albums
Miles Davis albums
Prestige Records albums
Albums produced by Bob Weinstock